Blue Mountain Summit (el. ) is a mountain pass in Oregon traversed by U.S. Route 26.

References

Mountain passes of Oregon
Landforms of Baker County, Oregon